La Center is a city in Clark County, Washington, United States. The population was 3,424 at the 2020 census.

History
In the 1870s, La Center was a business center and head of navigation on the East Fork of the Lewis River. In late summer, the regular schedules of the steamers Mascot and Walker, paddle-wheeling to Portland, were often interrupted by low water. Passengers and freight were transferred to scows, which were poled up the river or towed by horses along the bank. With the arrival of railroads and highways, La Center lost importance and lapsed into a small village serving the surrounding farming district. La Center was officially incorporated on August 27, 1909. Its population in 1940 was 193.

The city is home to two card rooms or casinos which allow gambling on card games and poker, but not slots. The two casinos are the Last Frontier and Palace.

Geography
La Center is located at  (45.863874, -122.668572).

Demographics

As of 2000, the median income for a household in the city was $55,333, and the median income for a family was $57,375. Males had a median income of $45,893 versus $28,750 for females. The per capita income for the city was $21,224. About 3.6% of families and 4.7% of the population were below the poverty line, including 6.1% of those under age 18 and 4.3% of those age 65 or over.

2010 census
As of the census of 2010, there were 2,800 people, 942 households, and 804 families residing in the city. The racial makeup of the city was 91.3% White, 1.0% African American, 0.8% Native American, 1.9% Asian, 1.5% from other races, and 3.4% from two or more races. Hispanic or Latino of any race were 4.6% of the population.

There were 942 households, of which 45.9% had children under the age of 18 living with them, 69.6% were married couples living together, 10.8% had a female householder with no husband present, 4.9% had a male householder with no wife present, and 14.6% were non-families. 11.3% of all households were made up of individuals, and 3.2% had someone living alone who was 65 years of age or older. The average household size was 2.97 and the average family size was 3.17.

The median age in the city was 36.6 years. 30.7% of residents were under the age of 18; 5.4% were between the ages of 18 and 24; 28.6% were from 25 to 44; 26.1% were from 45 to 64; and 9.4% were 65 years of age or older. The gender makeup of the city was 49.2% male and 50.8% female.

Notable residents
 Richard Curtis (Politician)

References

External links
 History of La Center at HistoryLink

Cities in Washington (state)
Cities in Clark County, Washington
Portland metropolitan area
1909 establishments in Washington (state)